Cedric Jan Itten (born 27 December 1996) is a Swiss professional footballer who plays as a centre forward for Swiss club Young Boys and the Switzerland national team.

Club career

Youth football
Itten started his youth football with FC Black Stars Basel in 2003, and then moved to BSC Old Boys a year later. In February 2007 he moved on to the youth department of Basel and played in their U-18 team and their U-21 team. Itten was a part of FC Basel's 2013–14 UEFA Youth League campaign.

Basel
Itten signed a three-year junior professional contract on 21 August 2015 and joined Basel's first team for their 2015–16 season under head coach Urs Fischer. After playing in two test games, Itten played his domestic league debut for the club in the home game in the St. Jakob-Park on 21 February 2016 as Basel won 5–1 against Vaduz. Itten played the assist as Birkir Bjarnason scored the last goal of the game. He scored his first league goal for his club on 13 February in the away game in the Cornaredo as Basel won 4–1 against Lugano. It was the teams forth goal, scored just before half time. With the team Itten won the Swiss Super League championship at the end of the 2015–16 Super League season. For the club it was the seventh title in a row and their 19th championship title in total.

Luzern (loan)
On 18 June 2016, Basel announced that they were loaning out Itten to FC Luzern, until the end of the 2016–17 Swiss Super League season, so that he could gain more first team playing experience. Itten had a successfuel season scoring three goals in 28 appearances. Then, on 23 June 2017 Basel announced that they were prolonging their contract with Itten until 30 June 2020 and were continuing the loan Itten to Luzern for another period, until the end of the 2017–18 season.

Return to Basel
Due to Basel's bad start to their 2017–18 season, due strikers transferring out and due to injuries of their replacements, on 13 September 2017 Basel announced that they had recalled striker Itten back from his loan. His first goal following his return was the winning goal for the team in the Stadio Comunale (Chiasso) during the 2017–18 Swiss Cup match on 17 September. It was the winning goal as Basel won 1–0 against FC Chiasso. Until the winter break Itten had 10 domestic league appearances, scoring two goals.

In January 2018 Itten was loaned to St. Gallen, but never returned to Basel.
During his period with the club, Itten played a total of 29 games for Basel scoring a total of five goals. 21 of these games were in the Swiss Super League, three in the Swiss Cup, two in the UEFA competitions (Champions League and Europa League) and three were friendly games. He scored three goals in the domestic league, one in the cup and the other was scored during the test games.

St. Gallen
On 17 January 2018, Basel announced that Itten would be loaned out to St. Gallen until the end of the season, with an option to buy. On 29 June 2018 it was announced that St. Gallen pulled the option and had bought the striker.

Rangers
On 4 August 2020, Itten signed for Scottish club Rangers, on a four-year deal and for an undisclosed fee, reported to be £2.7 million. On 9 August 2020, Itten made his debut for Rangers in a Scottish Premiership match against St Mirren.

On 27 September 2020, Itten scored his first two goals for Rangers, coming off the bench to score Rangers' fourth and fifth goals in a 5–1 win against Motherwell at Fir Park.

Greuther Fürth (loan)
On 31 August 2021, the last day of the 2021 summer transfer window Itten signed for German club Greuther Fürth on a season-long loan. On 12 January 2022, Itten’s loan was cut short as he was recalled by parent club Rangers.

Young Boys
On 1 June 2022, his transfer to Bernese club BSC Young Boys was announced. He signed a four-year contract with the Swiss Super League club.

International career
On 15 November 2019, Itten made his debut in the Switzerland national team, coming as a substitute in a 1–0 win over Georgia and scoring the only goal of the match. Three days later, he scored twice in a 6–1 win over Gibraltar.

Career statistics

Club

International goals
Scores and results list Switzerland's goal tally first, score column indicates score after each Itten goal.

Honours
FC Basel
 Swiss Super League: 2015–16

Rangers
Scottish Premiership: 2020–21
Scottish Cup: 2021–22

References

External links
 
 Profile at Swiss Football League

1996 births
Living people
Footballers from Basel
Swiss men's footballers
Association football forwards
Switzerland international footballers
Switzerland under-21 international footballers
Switzerland youth international footballers
Swiss Super League players
Scottish Professional Football League players
Bundesliga players
FC Basel players
FC Luzern players
FC St. Gallen players
Rangers F.C. players
SpVgg Greuther Fürth players
BSC Young Boys players
Swiss expatriate footballers
Swiss expatriate sportspeople in Scotland
Expatriate footballers in Scotland
Swiss expatriate sportspeople in Germany
Expatriate footballers in Germany